Borrowed & Blue is the fifth studio album by Australian country musician Troy Cassar-Daley, released on 19 April 2004 and peaked at number 89 on the ARIA Charts. The album is a covers album in which Cassar-Daley acknowledges as songs "he loves and that have influenced his own writing and singing style".

At the ARIA Music Awards of 2004, the album was nominated for the ARIA Award for Best Country Album.

Reception

Rolling Stone gave the album a positive review saying "While American Country goes down the road of super-slick production and overblown pomp, Australian artists have won hearts by bearing their songs, unadorned and honestly. So when Troy Cassar-Daley covers a set of tunes by his favorite artists, it's on that same honesty that the success of the risky project is riding. Fortunately, Cassar-Daley is shooting straight as ever - his casual charisma takes tracks as disparate as Tom Petty's "Yer So Bad" and Slim Dusty's "Loosin' My Blues Tonight" and turns them into his own brand of Australian country music." adding "It's his love of these tunes, and his consistently genuinely delivery of them, that makes this a real album and not just a novelty project."

Track listing

Charts

Release history

References

2004 albums
Troy Cassar-Daley albums